Master of Science in Management, abbreviated MSc, MScM, MIM or MSM, is a Master of Science academic degree. In terms of content, it is similar to the MBA degree as it contains general management courses.

According to a Financial Times ranking, the University of St. Gallen in Switzerland, HEC Paris in France offer the best Master in Management programmes in the world in 2016 and 2017.

Subjects
Graduates holding an MSc in Management have commonly studied the following subjects:
 Business Ethics
 Corporate and Business Strategy
 Economics
 Engineering management
 Entrepreneurship
 Finance
 Financial Management and managerial accounting
 Human Resources Management and Organizational Behavior
 Management Information Systems
 Management Theory
 Marketing or Marketing Management
 Operations Management and Supply Chain Management
 Protected Area Management
 Personal student dissertation (thesis)
In Canada, a highly specialized MSc in Management is also quite common (ex: MSc in Management in Finance and Accounting). These degrees are meant to provide students with a highly specialized set of skills for industry or for further academic study.

Comparison to MBA
As is the case with the MBA degree, as the number of school granting MSc in Management degrees has grown, so has the diversity of characteristics defining these programs. In most cases, the MSc in Management is an academic degree with no or some requirements for previous job experience, while the MBA is also a professional degree for persons with minimum 2–3 years job experience or 2nd class lower division honorees. However, there are also schools where the MSM degree is granted only to managers with extensive (typically 10 years or more) of work and managerial experience. Whereas MBA programs are open to people from all academic disciplines, about one third of the MSc in Management programs worldwide require a first degree in business or economics.

Some claim the MSc degree is more theory-oriented, and some programs do focus on specific skill set development for managers, while the MBA degree can be more practice-oriented and financially focused. In some schools, the MSc in Management degree studies the academic discipline of Management, while the MBA degree studies the academic discipline of Business Administration.  Thus, some MSc degree programs focus on research in a specialized area, while the MBA degree would place more emphasis on strategy. According to one school, "While the MBA program focuses on the practical application of management theory, the M.Sc. in Management will provide for an advanced-level conceptual foundation in a student’s chosen field, and allow for the pursuit of highly focused research through a master’s level thesis."

Both degrees contain strong professional focus and are both very well suited for professionals wishing to improve positions in their respective industries. Most MSc in Management programs contain very directed content geared towards development of a particular set of leadership skills for the mid-career professional looking to improve their credentials. Both the MBA and the MSc in Management can be completed online or in-person in roughly 1-2 years depending on the school providing the programs.

Persons admitted to the degree of MSc in Management are entitled to add the designation MSc or MSM after their names (e.g. Domeng Gomez MSc), while those holding an MBA can add the designation MBA (e.g. Domeng Gomez MBA). 
While the MBA degree was started in the United States, the MSc in Management degree is of European origin. There seems to be a tendency that the demand for MBA is saturated whereas the demand for Masters in Management is increasing.

See also 

 MPhil
 Master of Business Administration (MBA)
 Master of Management (MM)
 Master of Science in Finance
 Master of Commerce
 Doctor of Management

References 

Management, master
Business qualifications
Management education
Management cybernetics